Lazar "Lazo" Miloević (born 20 January 1975) is a Macedonian slalom canoer who competed in the early 1990s. He finished 31st in the C-1 event at the 1992 Summer Olympics in Barcelona as an Independent Olympic Participant.

References
Sports-reference.com profile

1975 births
Macedonian male canoeists
Canoeists at the 1992 Summer Olympics
Living people
Olympic canoeists as Independent Olympic Participants
Macedonian people of Serbian descent